Albert Shaw may refer to:

Albert D. Shaw (1841–1901), U.S. Representative from New York
Albert Shaw (footballer) (fl. 1924), English footballer (Grimsby Town)
Albert Shaw (journalist) (1857–1947), American journalist and academic

See also
Al Shaw (disambiguation)